Maximo Felipe Munzi (26 July 1957 – 16 December 2014) was an Argentine-born cinematographer, whose career spanned 30 years and included 104 films. He died of pancreatic cancer in Los Angeles on 16 December 2014, aged 57.

Partial filmography
Expecting a Miracle (2009)
The Storm (miniseries) (2009)
Ring of Death (2008)
Avenging Angel (2007)
Sacrifices of the Heart (2007)
Just Desserts (2004)
Momentum (2003)
Across the Line (2000)
Chain of Command (2000)
Judgment Day (1999)
Healer (1994)
Miami Connection (1987)

References

External links
 
 Official website

1950s births
2014 deaths
Argentine cinematographers
Deaths from pancreatic cancer